Oligotenes is a genus of moths belonging to the subfamily Tortricinae of the family Tortricidae.

Species
Oligotenes amblygrapha Diakonoff, 1973
Oligotenes antistita Diakonoff, 1974
Oligotenes chrysoteuches Diakonoff, 1954
Oligotenes hierophantis (Diakonoff, 1954)
Oligotenes polylampes Diakonoff, 1954

See also
List of Tortricidae genera

References

External links
tortricidae.com

Tortricidae genera